The Philippine eagle-owl (Ketupa philippensis) is a vulnerable species of owl belonging to the family Strigidae. It is endemic to the Philippines, where it is found in lowland forests on the islands of Catanduanes, Samar, Bohol, Mindanao, Luzon, Leyte and possibly Sibuyan. The Philippine eagle-owl feeds on rodents and amphibians. Due to its reliance on living in large lowland forests, forest conservation is important in order to maintain populations of the Philippine eagle-owl, which is becoming increasingly vulnerable to going extinct. The Philippine eagle-owl was previously listed as endangered, but due to destruction of lowland habitat and possible hunting, the eagle-owl has since been adjusted to the vulnerability of extinction.

Taxonomy
The Philippine eagle-owl was formally described in 1851 by the German naturalist Johann Jakob Kaup. He placed the owl in his new genus Pseudoptynx and coined the binomial name Pseudoptynx philippensi. The Philippine eagle-owl is now placed in the genus Ketupa that was introduced in 1831 by the French naturalist René Lesson.

Two subspecies are recognised:
K. p. philippensis (Kaup, 1851) – Luzon and Catanduanes (northern Philippines)
K. p. mindanensis (Ogilvie-Grant, 1906) – Mindanao, Leyte, Samar and Bohol (southern Philippines)

Description

It is overall rufous with a lighter belly and yellow eyes. It has a warm brown coloring with many markings on its back, with a bird call pitch of a long whistle that rises shortly and falls at the end. It is also described as being incredibly bulky and having tufted ears, closely resembling the buffy fish-owl (Ketupa ketupu). The subspecies K. p. mindanensis is darker and more heavily streaked than the nominate form.

Habitat
This owl inhabits forest edges near streams. They rest in a tree during the day and hunts hunt at dusk to feed on small vertebrates. The Philippine eagle-owl is the largest owl in the country.

Behavior 
Little is known about the behavior of this secretive species, but the powerful feet suggest it feeds on small mammals and birds.

This eagle-owl lays one egg per clutch and has an incubation period of 35 days.

Breeding in captivity 
In December 2005, Negros Forests and Ecological Foundation (NFEFI) in Bacolod was the first conservation center in the world to successfully hatch a Philippine eagle-owl (aptly nicknamed Bubo) in captivity and it has the only breeding pair of these owls in captivity anywhere in the world.

On November 21, 2005, conservationists at the center made world history when it successfully bred a Philippine eagle-owl in captivity. Notably NFEFI had first secured the first-ever captive breeding loan between DENR-accredited institutions in the Philippines, consisting of three pairs of eagle-owls from the Avilon Montalban Zoological Park in Montalban, Rizal and transported them to Bacolod in December 2002. Two pairs showed attraction, and the couple Hinahon and Suplada—local terms for "calm" and "snob"—made courtship. It was on November 21, 2005, that an owlet was discovered in the nest, about three days old, and named Bubo.  As Bubo grew, Suplada taught it how to tear pieces of mouse meat, thus rearing it.

In 2006, Suplada also laid one egg and another owlet was hatched through the aid of the World Owl Trust, Flora and Fauna International-Philippine Biodiversity Conservation program and the Avilon Zoological Park in Montalban Rizal. The Philippine eagle-owl is also protected in areas through the Conservation of Priority Protected Areas Project (CPPAP) in Luzon, Mts Kitanglad and Apo on MIndanao.

Hunting of the Philippine eagle-owl is illegal in the Philippines, but lacks proper enforcement because many local people are able to resist strict control attempts.

Early life 
After hatching, Philippine eagle-owl chicks need to be intensely cared for by their parents. These new chicks are unable to thermoregulate by themselves, so they need the body heat from their mother or father to keep them warm. These chicks are also unable to feed themselves due to their lack of ability to fly. The father bird will go out to catch the food while the mother will tear it up into smaller pieces for the chick to eat.

Threats 
The Philippine eagle-owl has faced threats from several factors within its habitat. Some of those factors include deforestation for agricultural use, commercial logging, and natural causes that destroy the bird's habitat such as catanduanes and typhoons. Another factor that was contributing to the near extinction of these birds was illegal hunting and lack of enforcing the laws. In the Philippines, some law enforcement agencies have poor management and internal corruption. This corruption contributes to the long surviving issue of poaching and illegal trading of animals.  Interbreeding has also threatened the eagle-owl since it produces offspring that are infertile and unable to produce.

References

External links 
 ARKive - images and movies of the Philippine Eagle-Owl (Bubo philippensis)
 Red Data Book

Philippine eagle-owl
Endemic birds of the Philippines
Philippine eagle-owl